Romifidine is a drug that is used in veterinary medicine as a sedative mainly in large animals such as horses, although it may be used in a wide variety of species. It is not used in humans, but is closely related in structure to the commonly used drug clonidine.

Romifidine acts as an agonist at the α2 adrenergic receptor subtype. Side effects can include bradycardia and respiratory depression. It is often used alongside other sedative or analgesic drugs such as ketamine or butorphanol. Yohimbine can be used as an antidote to rapidly reverse the effects.

References 

Analgesics
Alpha-2 adrenergic receptor agonists
Organobromides
Fluoroarenes
Anilines
Sedatives
Imidazolines